Dior Deposits is the debut studio album by American rapper Guapdad 4000. It was released on October 25, 2019 by TWNSHP and Warner Records. It includes features from Tory Lanez, 6LACK, Chance the Rapper, G-Eazy, Buddy, and Denzel Curry, among others.

Singles
On July 12, 2019, Guapdad 4000 released the single "Scammin" featuring Mozzy. In August, he released two more singles: "First Things First" featuring G-Eazy, and "Prada Process" featuring 6lack. On October 3, 2019, he released the next single "Gucci Pajamas" featuring Chance the Rapper and Charlie Wilson.

Critical reception
Aaron Williams of Uproxx wrote a positive review of the album saying "His jester-like geniality makes him a joy to listen to and his commitment to the craft of rapping makes listeners take him seriously. The hints of a broader story on Dior Deposits promise more artistic depths for him to plumb on future projects, while his creativity ensures that those tales will be told in engaging, innovative ways."

Track listing

References

2019 debut albums
Albums produced by Terrace Martin
Guapdad 4000 albums